Atatiana Koquice Jefferson, a 28-year-old woman, was shot inside her home by a police officer in Fort Worth, Texas, United States, in the early morning of October 12, 2019. Police arrived at her home after a neighbor called a non-emergency number, stating that Jefferson's front door was open. Police body camera footage showed officers walking outside the home with flashlights for a few minutes then one officer yells, "Put your hands up! Show me your hands!", while discharging his weapon through a window. Police found a handgun near Jefferson's body, which according to her eight-year-old nephew, she was pointing toward the window before being shot. On October 14, 2019, Officer Aaron Dean, the shooter, resigned from the Fort Worth Police Department and was arrested on a murder charge. On December 20, 2019, Dean was indicted for murder. Jefferson was black and the officer who shot her is white, prompting news outlets to compare Jefferson's shooting to the September 2018 murder of Botham Jean in nearby Dallas.

On December 15, 2022, Dean was found guilty on the lesser offense of manslaughter. He was sentenced to 11 years, 10 months, and 12 days of imprisonment.

People involved

Atatiana Jefferson 
Atatiana Koquice Jefferson (November 28, 1990 – October 12, 2019) was a 28-year-old African American woman and pre-medical graduate student of Xavier University of Louisiana. Relatives said she worked in human resources. She lived in the house to care for her mother and nephew.

Aaron Dean 
On October 14, 2019, Interim Police Chief Ed Kraus identified Officer Aaron Dean as the shooter. Dean was commissioned as an officer with the Fort Worth Police Department in April 2018 after completing the Fort Worth Police Academy a month prior in March 2018. At the time of the shooting, Dean had been with the department for approximately 18 months. Prior to the shooting, the only substantial entry in his Fort Worth police personnel file was about a traffic collision.

In 2004, Dean received a citation from the Arlington Police Department in his hometown of Arlington, Texas, for assault by contact, a class C misdemeanor, while at the University of Texas at Arlington for touching a woman's breast in the campus library. The incident was discussed during his videotaped job interview with the Fort Worth Police. He pled no contest and paid a fine. According to the Fort Worth Police Department, a Class C misdemeanor would not prevent employment with their department as a police officer.

Dean's training records from his first year on the job note concerns from supervisors. These concerns included that he had "tunnel vision" and "needs improvement on communicating with the public and fellow officers." Dean's most recent performance evaluation was made in the spring of 2019, where he received high marks from a supervisor.

Killing

Welfare call 
It has been reported that just prior to 2:30 a.m on the morning of October 12, 2019, police received a "welfare call" from the neighborhood of Hillside Morningside, noting that the front door to someone's home was open. According to Jefferson's family, prior to police arriving at her home, she was playing video games in her home with her nephew.

Open Structure 
During the trial it has been established that, rather than responding to a "welfare call" as previously reported, the officers were dispatched to a "Signal 56" or "Open Structure" call. It has been suggested that the police policy for these two calls is very different.

Body camera footage 
Body camera footage released by the Fort Worth Police Department shows that two officers had walked quietly around the side of the home. Officer Aaron Dean had walked into Jefferson's backyard. Seeing Jefferson in the window of her home, the officer yelled "put your hands up! Show me your hands!" and then fired a single shot through Jefferson's window.

Describing the video, the BBC wrote that Dean fired "within seconds" of seeing Jefferson. The BBC also wrote that the footage does not appear to show police identifying themselves or whether she was armed. The footage also does not show any indication if Dean could see the gun that Jefferson held, as the view through the window was obstructed by the reflection from his flashlight. The officer partnered with Dean told authorities that she could only see Jefferson's face through the window.

Nephew's account 
Jefferson's eight-year-old nephew told the authorities that while playing video games they heard noises outside the window.  The nephew stated in court under oath that Jefferson took her gun from her purse, walked to the window holding it at her side while looking out the window, before she was shot. The nephew's account was used as the basis for the arrest warrant. Interim Chief Kraus stated that it, "makes sense that she would have a gun if she felt that she was being threatened or there was someone in the backyard." According to the Jefferson family attorney Lee Merritt, the firearm was lawfully owned and Jefferson had a concealed carry license. The nephew testified that the front door was open because they were making hamburgers and they had burned, so the doors were open to let the smoke out.

Death 
Jefferson was killed by the shot and pronounced dead at 3:05 a.m at the scene. Police officers stated that they attempted to provide emergency medical care to Jefferson and were unsuccessful.

Investigation, arrest and indictment 
Police officials stated that the officer fired after perceiving a threat. Fort Worth Police Chief Ed Kraus stated that Dean resigned before he could be fired for what Kraus said included violating departmental policies on use of force, de-escalation, and unprofessional conduct. The separation paperwork for Dean was to be sent to the Texas Commission on Law Enforcement, and it would reflect that he was dishonorably discharged from the department.

Manny Ramirez, the president of the Fort Worth Police Officers Association, said Dean has never been the subject of a police investigation. Kraus said Dean has refused to cooperate with investigators and has not allowed Kraus to question him. Dean has not given an oral or written statement to investigators. Ramirez said he and other officers with knowledge of the situation were dumbfounded as to why Dean would have fired his weapon in this situation. Ramirez also said there was no way to explain Dean's actions.

Based on footage from Dean's body camera which captured the shooting, a warrant was issued for his arrest. He was arrested at his attorney's office on October 14, 2019, and charged with murder. He was given a $200,000 bond, which he posted, and was released about three hours later. Kraus said that Dean had not provided a written statement or answered questions.

On October 25, 2019, Tarrant County District Attorney Sharen Wilson said evidence would also be presented to a grand jury for a formal indictment. Dean is the only officer to face a murder charge in Tarrant County for a shooting committed while on duty. He was indicted by a grand jury on a murder charge on December 20, 2019 and was found guilty of manslaughter on December 15, 2022. Four days later on December 19, 2022, Dean was sentenced to 11 years, 10 months, and 12 days in prison for the killing, and was confined at the Lon Evans Corrections Center in Fort Worth.

Trial 
In October 2020, Tarrant County judge David Hagerman set a tentative date of August 2021 for Dean's trial. After being initially delayed due to a backlog in the courts stemming from the COVID-19 pandemic, the trial was rescheduled in November 2021 to begin on January 10, 2022. 

In December 2021, the trial was delayed again, to May 2022, due to two defense witnesses being unavailable in January.  At that time, Dean's defense attorneys filed a motion for a change of venue, claiming that local media coverage had made it impossible for their client to receive a fair and impartial trial in Tarrant County. 

On May 4, 2022, Judge Hagerman denied the defense's change of venue motion, but granted another postponement - this one due to health issues being experienced by Dean's lead attorney.  The new trial date was set for June 23.  On May 16, Dean's attorneys filed a motion asking Judge Hagerman for yet another delay, as they claimed to have higher priority cases in May and June and "cannot be ready" by June 23 because of the preparation time required to meet their caseload.
During a hearing on June 3, Dean's attorneys claimed that their own personal vacation plans should be considered for a further delay of the trial, but Hagerman denied their request and confirmed that the trial would begin on June 23.  On June 9, Dean's attorneys filed a motion asking for Judge Hagerman to be replaced, claiming that he had "grown increasingly hostile, overbearing and rude" to them.  On June 13, Tarrant County judge George Gallagher agreed to yet another delay in the trial pending the result of a hearing on the defense's recusal motion. On June 28, judge Lee Gabriel approved the defense's recusal motion, removing Hagerman from presiding over the trial. After Hagerman's recusal, the trial was assigned to Judge Gallagher and delayed again.

On August 18, 2022, a new trial date of December 5 was set, with jury selection slated to begin on November 28.  In November, Dean's attorneys filed another change of venue motion, claiming that their client could not get a fair trial in Tarrant County because former Fort Worth mayor Betsy Price and former police chief Ed Kraus had made public comments about the killing of Jefferson in the days after the shooting.  The second change of venue motion was denied and the trial began on December 5, 2022.

On December 15, 2022, Dean was found not guilty of murder but guilty of the lesser included offense of manslaughter. On December 20, he was sentenced to 11 years, 10 months, and 12 days of imprisonment. Dean is currently imprisoned in the Ramsey Unit in Rosharon, Texas.

Reactions 
Fort Worth Mayor Betsy Price called the event "tragic" and promised a "complete and thorough investigation" by police chief Ed Kraus. CBS News reported that the investigation would then be forwarded to the Law Enforcement Incident Team for the Tarrant County District Attorney.

The National Association for the Advancement of Colored People called Jefferson's death unacceptable. The neighbor who called for the welfare check told reporters that he never intended for an aggressive law enforcement response. He stated: "No domestic violence, no arguing. Nothing that they should have been concerned with, as far as them coming with guns drawn to my neighbor's house. There wasn't any reason for a gun shot that I know of."

Jefferson's funeral was paid for by two professional athletes; former Dallas Mavericks player Harrison Barnes and Philadelphia Eagles player Malik Jackson. A GoFundMe was also created by the family lawyer on behalf of the family.

The case has been cited as a cause of loss of trust in law enforcement. During a press conference in the days following the shooting, Kraus became emotional as he compared the erosion of public trust to ants working to build an anthill, when "somebody comes with a hose and washes it away and they just have to start from scratch."

In the weeks following Jefferson's death her father died from a heart attack, and her mother died following an illness in 2020.

References 

2010s in Fort Worth, Texas
2019 controversies in the United States
2019 in Texas
African-American history of Texas
African-American-related controversies
Black Lives Matter
Deaths by firearm in Texas
Deaths by person in Texas
Fort Worth Police Department
Law enforcement in Texas
October 2019 events in the United States
African Americans shot dead by law enforcement officers in the United States
History of women in Texas